Eradu Kanasu is a 1974 Indian Kannada-language romantic drama film directed by the duo Dorai–Bhagavan, and is based on the novel of the same name by Vani. The film stars Rajkumar, Kalpana and Manjula.

The film was a musical blockbuster with all the songs composed by Rajan–Nagendra considered evergreen hits. They were awarded with the Karnataka State Film Award for Best Music Director for 1974–75.

The movie saw a theatrical run of 30 weeks. The movie completed 100 days when it was re-released in 1982. The film's success led to its second re-release on 6 February 2015 across Karnataka state. The movie was remade in Telugu in 1975 as Pooja with three songs of this movie retained in the Telugu version.

Plot 
Ramachandra "Ramu" is a professor at a college in Bangalore, who is married to Gowri, the daughter of a lawyer for his mother's wishes, but is brooding over his past relationship with his cousin/love interest Lalitha, when her father refused to let Ramu marry Lalitha, due to some internal disputes. After their marriage, Ramu doesn't behave properly with Lalitha, who remains devoted to Ramu and is yearning for husband's love from Ramu. Ramu's parents observe his behaviour and leave for a pilgrimage, thinking that their absence might unite them. Gowri ask about Ramu negligent behaviour towards her, but to no avail. When Ramu visits his lecturer friend, he learns that his friend is happily married to Lalitha and has a child, where he realize his mistake of neglecting Gowri and heads to meet her at a temple. When Ramu meets Gouri (who is overjoyed), the former meets with an accident. Ramu admits her to an hospital, where she is shown terminally wounded. It leaves the viewer in a question that the women in Ramu's life were just two dreams ? (Eradu Kanasu)

Cast 

 Rajkumar as Ramu
 Kalpana as Gowri
 Manjula as Lalitha
 K. S. Ashwath as Ramu's father
 Balakrishna as uncle
 Rajanand as Lalitha's father
 Sampath as Gowri's father
 Advani Lakshmi Devi as Ramu's mother
 M. Jayashree as Gowri's mother
 Bhargavi Narayan as lecturer
 Ramgopal as Lalitha's husband
 Vaishali Kasaravalli as Latha
 Pandari Bai in Special Appearance

Production 
Eradu Kanasu is based on the novel of the same name by Vani. The song Endendu Ninnanu Martha was shot at Gajanur dam in Shivamoga district.

Themes and influences 
Though Eradu Kanasu is based on a novel, Muralidhara Khajane of The Hindu mentioned that the plot was similar to William Shakespeare's Romeo and Juliet.

Soundtrack 

The music was composed by Rajan–Nagendra with lyrics penned by Chi. Udaya Shankar. The album consists of six tracks. All the songs composed for the film were received extremely well and considered as evergreen songs.

The song Thamnam Thamnam was remixed by Mano Murthy in Abhinetri (2015).

Three songs from this movie were retained by Rajan–Nagendra in the Telugu version Pooja. The song Endendu Ninnanu Marethu  was retained in the Telugu version as Enneno Janmala Bandham. The song Baadi Hoda Balliyinda  was retained in the Telugu version as Malleteega Vaadipoga Marala Poolu Pooyuna. The song Poojisalende Hoogala Thande  was retained in the Telugu version as Poojalu Cheya Poolu Tecchanu.

The tune of the song Endendu Ninnanu Marethu  was used in the 1992 Hindi movie Jaan Se Pyaara as Bin Tere Kuch Bhi Nahi Hai Jeevan Mera.

Awards 
At the 1973–74 Karnataka State Film Awards, the film won the award for Best Music Director (Rajan–Nagendra).

Legacy 
The film is considered as one of the greatest romantic films in Kannada noted for the strong performances of lead actors Rajkumar and Kalpana.

The film's title inspired a 2017 film of same name starring Vijay Raghavendra.

References

External links 
 

1974 films
1970s Kannada-language films
Indian romantic drama films
Indian romantic musical films
Films scored by Rajan–Nagendra
Films based on Indian novels
Kannada films remade in other languages
1974 romantic drama films
1970s romantic musical films
Films directed by Dorai–Bhagavan